Looney Tunes Platinum Collection: Volume 1 is a Blu-ray Disc and DVD box set by Warner Home Video. It was released on November 15, 2011. It contains 50 Looney Tunes and Merrie Melodies cartoons and numerous supplements. A DVD version of the box set was released on July 3, 2012, but contained no extras.

All but seven cartoons included on this volume - Lovelorn Leghorn, The Hasty Hare, Hare-Way to the Stars, Bill of Hare, A Witch's Tangled Hare, Feline Frame-Up, and From A to Z-Z-Z-Z - were previously released as a part of the Looney Tunes Golden Collection or a Looney Tunes Super Stars DVD. Three others were released as part of other sets.

Disc 1

Special features

Behind the Tunes
 Wagnerian Wabbit: The Making of What's Opera, Doc?
 Twilight in Tunes: The Music of Raymond Scott
Powerhouse in Pictures
 Putty Problems and Canary Rows
 A Chuck Jones Tutorial: Tricks of the Cartoon Trade
 The Charm of Stink: On the Scent of Pepé Le Pew

Alternate audio tracks
 Audio commentaries
 Eric Goldberg on Baseball Bugs, Buccaneer Bunny, Rabbit Hood, Rabbit of Seville, Robin Hood Daffy, Scaredy Cat
 Greg Ford on The Old Grey Hare
 Jerry Beck on 8 Ball Bunny, Speedy Gonzales
 Chuck Jones, Maurice Noble and Michael Maltese on What's Opera, Doc?
 Daniel Goldmark on What's Opera, Doc?
 John Kricfalusi on The Great Piggy Bank Robbery
 Paul Dini on A Pest in the House
 Michael Barrier and Mel Blanc on The Scarlet Pumpernickel
 Michael Barrier and Chuck Jones on Duck Amuck
 Michael Barrier and Bob Clampett on Baby Bottleneck, A Tale of Two Kitties
 Michael Barrier on Kitty Kornered, Beep, Beep
 Jerry Beck and Martha Sigall on Old Glory
 Greg Ford and Friz Freleng on Tweetie Pie
 Michael Barrier, Michael Maltese and Treg Brown on Fast and Furry-ous
 Michael Barrier and Michael Maltese on For Scent-imental Reasons
 Music-only tracks include: What's Opera, Doc?, The Scarlet Pumpernickel, Duck Amuck, Robin Hood Daffy, Speedy Gonzales
 Vocal-only tracks include: What's Opera, Doc?

Disc 2

Special features

Behind the Tunes
 It Hopped One Night: The Story Behind One Froggy Evening
 Wacky Warner One-Shots
 Mars Attacks! Life on the Red Planet with My Favorite Martian (provided in HD)
 Razzma-Taz: Giving the Tasmanian Devil His Due (provided in HD)
 The Ralph Phillips Story: Living the American Daydream (provided in HD)

Alternate Audio Tracks

 Audio commentaries 
 Michael Barrier, Corny Cole, Chuck Jones, Maurice Noble and Michael Maltese on One Froggy Evening
 Jerry Beck and Stan Freberg on Three Little Bops
 Eric Goldberg on I Love to Singa, Chow Hound, Bewitched Bunny, From A to Z-Z-Z-Z, Boyhood Daze
 Michael Barrier, John McGrew, Paul Julian and Gene Fleury on The Dover Boys at Pimento University
 Michael Barrier and Pete Alvarado on Haredevil Hare
 Michael Barrier and Maurice Noble on Duck Dodgers in the 24½th Century
 Jerry Beck on Devil May Hare
 June Foray on Broom-Stick Bunny
 Greg Ford on Feed the Kitty
 Amid Amidi on From A to Z-Z-Z-Z
 Music-only tracks include: One Froggy Evening, Three Little Bops, Hare-Way to the Stars, Ducking the Devil, A Witch's Tangled Hare, Feed the Kitty and Boyhood Daze 
 Music-and-effects tracks include: Bewitched Bunny, Broom-Stick Bunny and Feline Frame-Up
 Vocal-only tracks include: Three Little Bops

Disc 3: Bonus Materials
 A Greeting from Chuck Jones
 Chuck Amuck: The Movie
 Chuck Jones: Extremes & In-Betweens, a Life in Animation
 Chuck Jones: Memories of Childhood
 The Animated World of Chuck Jones (9 Cartoons)
Point Rationing of Foods
Hell-Bent for Election
So Much for So Little
Orange Blossoms for Violet
A Hitch in Time
90 Day Wondering
Drafty, Isn't It?
The Dot and the Line: A Romance in Lower Mathematics
The Bear That Wasn't
 How the Grinch Stole Christmas! Pencil Test
 The Door (provided in HD)
 Bonus Cartoons (9 Cartoons)
The Fright Before Christmas from Bugs Bunny's Looney Christmas Tales
Spaced Out Bunny from Bugs Bunny's Bustin' Out All Over
Duck Dodgers and the Return of the 24½th Century from Daffy Duck’s Thanks-for-Giving (censored version)
Another Froggy Evening
Marvin the Martian in the Third Dimension
Superior Duck
From Hare to Eternity
Father of the Bird
Museum Scream (provided in HD)

See also
 Looney Tunes Golden Collection
 Looney Tunes and Merrie Melodies filmography
 Looney Tunes and Merrie Melodies filmography (1929–1939)
 Looney Tunes and Merrie Melodies filmography (1940–1949)
 Looney Tunes and Merrie Melodies filmography (1950–1959)
 Looney Tunes and Merrie Melodies filmography (1960–1969)
 Looney Tunes and Merrie Melodies filmography (1970–present and miscellaneous)

References

Looney Tunes home video releases